The deportation of Armenian intellectuals is conventionally held to mark the beginning of the Armenian genocide. Leaders of the Armenian community in the Ottoman capital of Constantinople (now Istanbul), and later other locations, were arrested and moved to two holding centers near Angora (now Ankara). The order to do so was given by Minister of the Interior Talaat Pasha on 24 April 1915. On that night, the first wave of 235 to 270 Armenian intellectuals of Constantinople were arrested. With the adoption of the Tehcir Law on 29 May 1915, these detainees were later relocated within the Ottoman Empire; most of them were ultimately killed. More than 80 such as Vrtanes Papazian, Aram Andonian, and Komitas survived.

The event has been described by historians as a decapitation strike, which was intended to deprive the Armenian population of leadership and a chance for resistance. To commemorate the victims of the Armenian genocide, 24 April is observed as Armenian Genocide Remembrance Day. First observed in 1919 on the fourth anniversary of the events in Constantinople, the date is generally considered the date on which the genocide began. The Armenian genocide has since been commemorated annually on the same day, which has become a national memorial day in Armenia and the Republic of Artsakh and is observed by the Armenian diaspora around the world.

Deportation

Detention
The Ottoman Minister of the Interior Talaat Pasha gave the detention order on 24 April 1915. The operation commenced at 8 p.m. In Constantinople, the action was led by Bedri Bey, the Chief of Police of Constantinople. On the night of 24–25 April 1915, in a first wave 235 to 270 Armenian leaders of Constantinople, clergymen, physicians, editors, journalists, lawyers, teachers, politicians, and others were arrested upon an instruction of the Ministry of the Interior. The discrepancies in numbers may be explained by the uncertainties of the police as they imprisoned people with similar names.

There were further deportations from the capital. The first task was to identify those imprisoned. They were held for one day in a police station (Ottoman Turkish: Emniyeti Umumiye) and the Central Prison. A second wave brought the figure to between 500 and 600.

By the end of August 1915, about 150 Armenians with Russian citizenship were deported from Constantinople to holding centers. A few of the detained, including writer Alexander Panossian (1859–1919), were released the same weekend before even being transferred to Anatolia. In total, it is estimated that 2,345 Armenian notables were detained and eventually deported, most of whom were not nationalists and did not have any political affiliations.

Holding centers

After the passage of Tehcir Law on 29 May 1915, Armenians left at the two holding centers were deported to Ottoman Syria. Most of the arrested were transferred from Central Prison over Saray Burnu by steamer No. 67 of the Şirket company to the Haydarpaşa train station. After waiting for ten hours, they were sent by special train in the direction of Angora (Ankara) the next day. The entire convoy consisted of 220 Armenians. An Armenian train conductor got a list of names of the deportees. It was handed over to the Armenian Patriarch of Constantinople, Zaven Der Yeghiayan, who immediately tried in vain to save as many deportees as possible. The only foreign ambassador to help him in his efforts was US ambassador Henry Morgenthau. After a train journey of 20 hours, the deportees got off in Sincanköy (near Angora) Tuesday noon. At the station Ibrahim, the director of the Central Prison of Constantinople, did the triage. The deportees were divided into two groups.

One group was sent to Çankırı (and Çorum between Çankırı and Amasya) and the other to Ayaş. Those separated for Ayaş were transported in carts for a couple of hours further to Ayaş. Almost all of them were killed several months later in gorges near Angora. Only 10 (or 13) deportees of this group were granted permission to return to Constantinople from Ayaş. A group of 20 latecomers arrested on 24 April arrived in Çankırı around 7 or 8 May 1915. Roughly 150 political prisoners were detained in Ayaş, and another 150 intellectual prisoners were detained in Çankırı.

Court martial
Some notables such as Dr. Nazaret Daghavarian and Sarkis Minassian were removed on 5 May from the Ayaş prison and taken under military escort to Diyarbakır along with Harutiun Jangülian, Karekin Khajag, and Rupen Zartarian to appear before a court martial. They were, seemingly, murdered by state-sponsored paramilitary groups led by Cherkes Ahmet, and lieutenants Halil and Nazım, at a locality called Karacaören shortly before arriving at Diyarbakır. Marzbed, another deportee, was dispatched to Kayseri to appear before a court martial on 18 May 1915.

The militants responsible for the murders were tried and executed in Damascus by Djemal Pasha in September 1915; the incident later became the subject of a 1916 investigation by the Ottoman Parliament led by Artin Boshgezenian, the deputy for Aleppo. After Marzbed's release from the court, he worked under a false Ottoman identity for the Germans in Intilli (Amanus railway tunnel). He escaped to Nusaybin, where he fell from a horse and died shortly before the armistice.

Release

Several prisoners were released with the help of various influential people intervening on their behalf. Five deportees from Çankırı were freed upon the intervention of the United States ambassador Henry Morgenthau. In total, 12 deportees were granted permission to return to Constantinople from Çankırı. These were Komitas, Piuzant Kechian, Dr. Vahram Torkomian, Dr. Parsegh Dinanian, Haig Hojasarian, Nshan Kalfayan, Yervant Tolayan, Aram Kalenderian, Noyig Der-Stepanian, Vrtanes Papazian, Karnik Injijian, and Beylerian junior. Four deportees were granted permission to come back from Konya. These were Apig Miubahejian, Atamian, Kherbekian, and Nosrigian.

The remaining deportees were under the protection of the governor of Angora Vilayet. Mazhar Bey defied the orders of deportation from Talat Pasha, the Interior Minister, and was replaced by central committee member Atif Bey by the end of July 1915.

Survivors
After the Armistice of Mudros (30 October 1918), several surviving Armenian intellectuals came back to Constantinople, which was under an allied occupation. They started a short, but intense, literary activity that was ended by the Turkish victory in 1923. Those who have written memoirs and books about their accounts during the deportation include Grigoris Balakian, Aram Andonian, Yervant Odian, Teotig, and Mikayel Shamtanchyan. Other survivors, such as Komitas, developed serious cases of post-traumatic stress disorder. Komitas underwent 20 years of treatment in mental asylums until his death in 1935.

Day of remembrance

The official date of remembrance for the Armenian genocide is 24 April, the day that marked the beginning of the deportation of Armenian intellectuals. The first commemoration, organized by a group of Armenian Genocide survivors, was held in Istanbul in 1919 at the local St.Trinity Armenian church. Many prominent figures in the Armenian community participated in the commemoration. Following its initial commemoration in 1919, the date became the annual day of remembrance for the Armenian genocide.

Notable deportees
Below is a list of prominent Armenian intellectuals, community leaders and other public figures that were deported from Constantinople on 24 April 1915, the first wave of the deportations. The list of names are those that have been provided in the Ottoman Archives and various Armenian sources:
{| class="wikitable sortable" border="1"
|-
! style="width:4em" scope=col| Name
! style="width:7em" scope=col| Birth dateand place
! style="width:1em" scope=col| Fate
! style="width:5em" scope=col| Political affiliation
! Occupation
! style="width:4em" scope=col| Deported to
! scope=col| Notes
|-
| Սարգիս Ապօ
|
| Killed
| Dashnak
| Teacher
| Ayaş
| Armenian from Caucasus, killed in Angora (Ankara).
|-
| Լեւոն Աղապապեան
| 1887  from Bitlis
| Died
|
| Mathematician, headmaster of high schools in Kütahya and Akşehir (1908–14), directed his own school in Kütahya for three years
| Çankırı
| Died in 1915.
|-
| Հրանդ Աղաճանեան
|
| Killed
|
|
| Çankırı
| Brought to the gallows in Beyazıt Square (Constantinople) on 18 January 1916.
|-
| Միհրան Աղաճանեան
|
| Killed
|
| Banker
| Ayaş
| Returned to Constantinople where he was brought to the gallows.
|-
| Միհրան Աղասեան
| 1854 in Adrianople (Edirne)
| Killed
|
| Poet and musician
| Der Zor
| Deported to Der Zor, where he was killed in 1916.
|-
| Խաչատուր Մալումեան
| 1865  in Zangezur
| Killed
| Dashnak
| Dashnak militant, newspaper editor, played a role in organizing an assembly of forces in opposition to the Ottoman Sultan, resulting in the proclamation of the Ottoman Constitution in 1908.
| Ayaş
| Removed from the Ayaş prison on 5 May and taken under military escort to Diyarbakır along with Daghavarian, Jangülian, Khajag, Minassian and Zartarian to appear before a court martial there and they were, seemingly, murdered by state-sponsored paramilitary groups led by Cherkes Ahmet, and lieutenants Halil and Nazım, at a locality called Karacaören shortly before arriving at Diyarbakır. The murderers were tried and executed in Damascus by Cemal Pasha in September 1915, and the assassinations became the subject of a 1916 investigation by the Ottoman Parliament led by Artin Boshgezenian, the deputy for Aleppo.
|-
| Տիգրան Աճեմեան
|
| Survived
|
|
| Ayaş
| Returned to Constantinople out of a group of ten deportees from Ayaş.
|-
|   Տիգրան Ալլահվերտի
|
| Survived
|
| Member of different patriarchal councils
| Ayaş
| Returned to Constantinople.
|-
| Վահան Ալթունեան
|
| Survived
|
| Dentist
| Çankırı
| Permitted to return to Constantinople soon after 11 May 1915. He left Çankırı on 6 August 1915, was jailed in Angora, was displaced to Tarson, arrived in Constantinople on 22 September 1915.
|-
|  Վահրամ Ալթունեան
|
| Died
|
| Merchant
| Çankırı
|
|-
| Արամ Անտոնեան
| 1875  in Constantinople
| Survived
| Hunchak Հնչակեան Վերակազմ
| Writer and journalist; member of Armenian National Assembly
| Çankırı
| Belonged to the second convoy with only one or two survivors that left Çankırı on 19 August 1915, broke his leg, was jailed in Angora 20–24 August then escaped after hospitalization in Angora Hospital. He joined another caravan of deportees and returned to Constantinople only after Tarsus, Mardin, Der Zor, Haleb, he stayed in concentration camps around the town of Meskene in the desert, published his experiences in his literary work In those dark days, he edited a collection of telegrams, the authenticity of which is disputed, containing Talat Pasha's extermination orders; he assumed directorship of the AGBU Nubar library in Paris from 1928 to 1951.
|-
| Վ. Արապեան
|
|
|
| Patriot or educator
|
|
|-
| Սարգիս Արմտանցի
|
| Killed
|
|
| Ayaş
| Killed in Angora.
|-
| Գ. Արմունի
|
|
|
| Lawyer
|
|
|-
| Ասատուր Արսենեան
|
| Killed
|
| Pharmacist
| Çankırı
| Belonged to the second convoy with only one or two survivors that left Çankırı on 19 August 1915, jailed in Angora 20–24 August killed en route to Yozgat or died near Der Zor.
|-
| ArslanianԱրսլանեան
|
|
|
| Merchant(?)
| Çankırı
|
|-
| ArtsruniԱրծրունի
|
| Killed
|
| Patriot or educator
| Çankırı
|
|-
| Պարոյր Արզումանեան
|
| Killed
|
|
| Çankırı
| Belonged to the second convoy with only one or two survivors that left Çankırı on 19 August 1915, jailed in Angora 20–24 August, killed en route to Yozgat.
|-
| Վահրամ Ասատուրեան
| from Gedikpaşa
| Survived
|
| Pharmacist
| Çankırı
| Deported to Meskene where he served finally in the army as assistant physician and helped Armenian deportees.
|-
| Յ. Ասատուրեան
|
| Survived
|
| Print office owner

| Ayaş
| Granted permission to return.
|-
| Յարութիւն Աստուրեան
|
| Killed
|
|
| Ayaş
| Killed in Angora.
|-
| Հրանդ Աստուածատրեան
|
| Survived
|
|
| Ayaş
| Returned to Constantinople.
|-
| Տ. Աշխարունի
|
|
|
| Patriot or educator

|
|
|-
| AtamianԱդամեան
| from Erzurum
| Survived
|
| Merchant

| Konya
| Granted permission to return.
|-
| Վարդերես Աթանասեան
| 1874
| Died
| Hunchak
| "Headman" (mukhtar) of Feriköy, merchant

| Çankırı
| Died in 1916 (?)
|-
| Եղիսէ Քհնյ. Այվազեան
| 13 October 1870  in Bolu
|
|
| Clergyman

| Jailed in Constan­tinople for two months
| Deported to Konya, Bey Shehir, Konya, Ulukshla, Ereyli (where he met many clergymen from Bardizag), Bozanti, Cardaklik, Tarsus. He left Tarsus on 15 October 1915 in direction of Osmaniye, Islahiye, Tahtaköprü to the outskirts of Aleppo.
|-
| AzarikԱզարիք
|
| Died
|
| Pharmacist

| Çankırı
| Died in Der Zor.
|-
| Գրիգորիս Պալաքեան
| 1879  in Tokat
| Survived
|
| Clergyman

| Çankırı
| Escaped. Lived in Manchester and Marseille after the war — Published his memoirs of exile. Died in Marseille in 1934.
|-
| BalassanՊալասան
| Muslim from Persia
| Killed
| Adopted as child by Dashnak
| Doorman and coffee boy for editorial staff of Azadamard

| Ayaş
| Killed despite intervention from Persian Embassy.
|-
| Խաչիկ Պարտիզպանեան
|
| Killed
|
| Public figure
| Ayaş
| Killed in Angora.
|-
| Լեւոն Պարտիզպանեան
| 1887  in Kharpert
|
| Dashnak
| Physician and director of Azadamard

|
|
|-
| Վաղինակ Պարտիզպանեան
|
| Survived
|
|Official of the Khayrie navigation company

| Çankırı
| Permitted to return to Constantinople soon after 11 May 1915.
|-
| Զարեհ Պարտիզպանեան
|
| Survived
|
| Dentist

| Çankırı
| Permitted to return to Constantinople by special telegramme from Talat Pasha on 7 May 1915. The eight prisoners of this group were notified on Sunday, 9 May 1915, about their release and left Çankırı on 11 May 1915.
|-
| Մանուկ Պասմաճեան
|
| Survived
|
| Architect and intellectual

| Çankırı
| Permitted to return to Constantinople soon after 11 May 1915.
|-
| Մկրտիչ Պասմաճեան
|
| Survived
|
| Arms dealer

| Çankırı
| Sent to İzmit for further interrogations together with other deportees. Fled to Konya. Was deported again, managed to escape half way to Der Zor and returned to Constantinople.
|-
| Տ. Պազտիկեան
|
|
|
| Patriot or educator

|
|
|-
| BedigՊետիկ
|
|
|
| Writer, publicist

|
|
|-
| Մովսէս Պետրոսեան
|
|
| Dashnak
| Teacher

| Çankırı
| Set free as he was a Bulgarian national and returned to Sofia.
|-
|  Կ. Պէյլիքճեան
|
|
|
| Merchant

|
|
|-
| Խաչիկ Պէրպէրեան
|
| Survived
|
| Teacher

| Ayaş
| Returned to Constantinople.
|-
|  Ե. Պէյազեան
|
|
|
| Patriot or educator

|
|
|-
| BeylerianՊէյլերեան
|
|
| Son of Hagop Beylerian
|
| Çankırı
|
|-
| Յակոբ Պէյլերեան
| 1843  from Kayseri(?)
| Survived
| Father of Beylerian son
| Merchant
| Çankırı
| Permitted to return to Constantinople soon after 11 May 1915, died in 1921(?)
|-
| Արթին Պօղոսեան
|
| Survived
|
|
| Çankırı
| "Pardoned on condition on not returning to Constantinople" according to a telegramme from the Ministry of the Interior on 25 August 1915 on the subject of exiles erroneously unlisted in a former 3 August telegramme.
|-
| Խաչիկ Պօղոսեան
|
| Survived
|
| Doctor, psychologist, deputy of the Armenian National Assembly
| Ayaş
| Arrested 24 April 1915, exiled 3 May 1915. He arrived in Constantinople after further deportation from Ayaş to Angora and Aleppo after the armistice. Lived in Aleppo after the war. Founded a hospital. Published his memoirs of exile – d. 1955 in Aleppo.
|-
| (Mourad)Համբարձում Պօյաճեան
(Մուրատ)
| 1867 in Hadjin(Saimbeyli today)
| Killed
| Hunchak
| Doctor, with a long and well-known history of political activity and agitation, one of the first organizers of the Hunchak in 1888 and one of its leaders, principal organizer of the 1890 Kumkapı affray, leader of the 1894–1895 Sasun revolt, after 1908 Armenian National Assembly delegate from Kumkapı and deputy of Ottoman Parliament from Adana. Mourad was his nom de guerre.

| Çankırı
| He was led to Kayseri to appear before a court martial and then was executed there in 1915.
|-
| Բիւզանդ Պօզաճեան
|
| Survived
|
| Member of Armenian National Assembly

| Ayaş
| Returned to Constantinople.
|-
|-
| Ղ. Չպլաքեան
|
| Survived
|
|
| Konya
| Deported to Konya, Tarsus, Kuşcular, Belemedik. Returned to Constantinople after the armistice.
|-
| Երունդ Չաւուշեան
| 1867  Constantinople
| Died
| Hunchak
| Armenian scientist, teacher, editor-in-chief of "Tzayn Hayrenyats" newspaper.

| Çankırı
| Deported to Hama, Der Zor, where he died from illness. He died at the same time in the same tent in a village near Meskene as Husig A. Kahanay Katchouni.
|-
| ChebjieՋպճը
|
|
| Armenian-Catholic
| Architect

| Çankırı
|
|-
|  Տիգրան Չէօկիւրեան
| 1884  Gyumushkana
| Killed
|
| Writer, publicist, teacher and chief editor of Vostan.

| Ayaş
| Killed in Angora; brother of Chökürian below
|-
| ChökürianՉէօկիւրեան
|
|
|
| Writer, publicist

|
| Brother of Dikran Chökürian
|-
| Գասպար Չերազ
| 1850  in Hasköy
| Survived
|
| Lawyer, public figure, brother of Minas Cheraz
| Çankırı
| Departed from Çankırı in winter after seven months and survived the next three years as refugee in Uşak together with his companions Hovhan Vartaped Garabedian, Mikayel Shamtanchian, Vartan Kahanay Karagözian from Feriköy. After the armistice he returned to Constantinople. He was deported instead of his brother Minas Cheraz who emigrated to France, Kaspar Cheraz died in 1928 in Constantinople.
|-
|  Գ. Չուհաճեան
|
|
|
| Merchant

|
|
|-
|-
| Ահարոն Տատուրեան
| 1886  in Ovacik (near İzmit)
| Survived
|
| Poet

| Eregli
| Returned to Constantinople after the armistice. After a brief sojourn in Constantinople and Bulgaria, he pursued his studies in Prague (1923–28) and settled in France in the late 1920s. He died in 1965.
|-
| Նազարէթ Տաղաւարեան
| 1862  Sebastia
| Killed
|
| Physician, director of Surp Prgitch Hospital, deputy in the Ottoman parliament, deputy for Sivas in the Armenian National Assembly, founding member of Armenian General Benevolent Union.

| Ayaş
| Removed from the Ayaş prison on 5 May and taken under military escort to Diyarbakır along with Agnouni, Jangülian, Khajag, Minassian and Zartarian to appear before a court martial there and they were, seemingly, murdered by state-sponsored paramilitary groups led by Cherkes Ahmet, and lieutenants Halil and Nazım, at a locality called  shortly before arriving at Diyarbakır, killed on the way to Urfa. The murderers were tried and executed in Damascus by Cemal Pasha in September 1915, and the assassinations became the subject of a 1916 investigation by the Ottoman Parliament led by Artin Boshgezenian, the deputy for Aleppo.
|-
| DanielianԴանիէլեան
|
| Survived
| Hunchak
| Tailor

| Çankırı
|
|-
| Պօղոս Դանիէլեան
|
| Died
| Dashnak
| Lawyer

| Çankırı
| Died in Der Zor.
|-
| Կարապետ Տէօվլեթեան
|
| Survived
|
| Official of the mint

| Çankırı
| Permitted to return to Constantinople soon after 11 May 1915.
|-
| (Shahnour)Ներսես Տէր-Գաբրիէլեան(Շահնուր)
| from Kayseri
| Killed
|
|
| Çankırı
| Belonged to the second convoy with only one or two survivors that left Çankırı on 19 August 1915, jailed in Angora 20–24 August killed en route to Yozgat.
|-
| Նոյիկ Տէր-Ստեփանեան
| from Erzincan
| Survived
|
| Commission agent, merchant and banker

| Çankırı
| Permitted to return to Constantinople soon after 11 May 1915. About 40 members of his family died.
|-
|  Բարսեղ Տինանեան
|
| Survived
|
| Physician

| Çankırı
| Permitted to return to Constantinople soon after 11 May 1915. One of the organizers of the commemoration ceremony of 24 April 1919.
|-
|  Գ. Տիրացուեան
|
|
|
| Writer, publicist

|
|
|-
|  Խոր. Տխրունի
|
|
|
| Writer, publicist

|
|
|-
|  Գրիգոր Ճելալ
|
| Survived
| Hunchak
|
| Çankırı
| Permitted to return to Constantinople soon after 11 May 1915.
|-
|  Միսաք Ճէվահիրճեան
| 1858  from Kayseri
| Survived
|
| Physician (gynaecologist at the court), member of a tribunal council

| Çankırı
| Permitted to return to Constantinople on 11 May 1915. The eight prisoners of this group were notified on Sunday, 9 May 1915, about their release and left Çankırı on 11 May 1915. Set free with the help of his friend Pesin Omer Paşa, died in 1924.
|-
| (Hrachia Surenian)Արմէն Տօրեան (Հրաչեայ Սուրէնեան)
| 1892  Sinop
| Killed
|
| French-Armenian poet, editor of "Arene" weekly (Paris), founder of the Pantheist school.

| Çankırı
| Finished the Sorbonne University in 1914 and returned to Constantinople. Deported to Çankırı, killed in Anatolian desert; was jailed in Angora after Çankırı and killed according to Nshan Kalfayan, killed near Angora.
|-
|-
| (Silvio Ricci)
|
| Survived
|
|
| Ayaş
| Set free as Bulgarian national and returned to Bulgaria.
|-
| Բարունակ Ֆէրուխան
| 1884 inConstantinople
| Killed
|
| Official of Bakırköy (Makriköy) administration and violinist

| Çankırı
| Belonged to the second convoy with only one or two survivors that left Çankırı on 19 August 1915, jailed in Angora 20–24 August killed en route to Yozgat.
|-
|  Յովհան Վրդ. Կարապետեան
| 22 June 1888  in Brusa
| Survived
|
| Clergyman, M.A. of University of Columbia, secretary of patriarch Zaven
| Çankırı
| Studied in the United States, came back in 1914 and was ordained priest on 16 June 1914 in Echmiadzin. He departed from Çankırı in winter after seven months and survived the next three years as refugee in Uşak together with his companions Kaspar Cheraz, Mikayel Shamtanchian, Vartan Kahanay Karagözian from Feriköy. After the armistice he returned to Constantinople and became priest in Gedikpaşa and Balat, member of the religious council. From 20 July 1919 – 5 August 1920 he was elected primate of İzmir. Later he got a higher degree as celibate priest (Ծ. Վրդ.). On 8 January 1921 he left for America and became priest of the St. Lusavorich church in New York. He survived and left the clergy.
|-
| Մկրտիչ Կարապետեան
|
| Survived
| Armenian-Catholic
|
| Ayaş
| Granted permission to return to capital as he was wrongly imprisoned in place of the teacher with same name.
|-
| GhazarosՂազարոս
|
|
| Dashnak
|
| Çankırı
| Deported in lieu of Marzbed (Ghazar Ghazarian).
|-
| GhonchegülianՂոնչէկիւլեան
|
| Died
|
| Merchant from Akn
| Çankırı
| Died near Meskene.
|-
| Krikor Torosian (Gigo)Գրիգոր Թորոսեան (Կիկօ)
| 1884 in Akn
| Killed
|
| Editor of the satirical newspaper Gigo
| Ayaş
| Killed in Angora.
|-
| Gülustanian Կիւլուստանեան
|
| Killed / Survived
|
| Dentist
| Çankırı
| "Permitted to reside freely in Çankırı" according to a telegramme from the Ministry of the Interior on 25 August 1915 on the subject of exiles erroneously unlisted in a former 3 August telegramme. Killed in a village called Tüney in 1915, together with Ruben Sevak, Daniel Varoujan and Mağazacıyan in a group of five.
|-
|   Մելքոն Կիւլուստանեան
|
| Survived
|
|
| Ayaş
| Relative of his namesake in Çankırı; set free and returned to Constantinople.
|-
| Հայկ Կօշկարեան
|
| Survived
|
| Editor of Odian and Gigo
| Der Zor
| Survived deportation to Der Zor and returned to Constantinople after the armistice.
|-
| Reverend Սուրբ Հայր Գրիգորեան
|
|
|
| Pastor and editor of Avetaper
| Çankırı
|
|-
| Մելքոն Կիւլեսերեան
|
| Survived
|
|
| Çankırı
| Permitted to return to Constantinople soon after 11 May 1915.
|-
| Միհրդատ Հայկազն
|
| Killed
| Dashnak
| Patriot or educator, member of Armenian National Assembly, umbrella merchant.

| Ayaş
| Banished a couple of times and then killed in Angora.
|-
|  Գ. Հաճեան
|
| Survived
|
| Pharmacist

| Çankırı
| Returned from Çankırı after the armistice.
|-
| Համբարձում Համբարձումեան
| 1890 in Constantinople
| Killed
|
| Writer, publicist

| Ayaş
| Killed in Angora.
|-
| Յովհաննէս Հանիսեան
|
| Survived
|
|
| Çankırı
| "Pardoned on condition on not returning to Constantinople" according to a telegramme from the Ministry of the Interior on 25 August 1915 on the subject of exiles erroneously unlisted in a former 3 August telegramme.
|-
| Արտաշէս Յարութիւնեան
| 1873  Malkara (near Rodosto)
| Killed
|
| Writer, publicist
|
| Stayed in Üsküdar on 24 April 1915. Arrested on 28 July 1915 and severely beaten at the Müdüriyet. When his father came to see him he was imprisoned as well. Father and son were deported together with 26 Armenians to Nicomedia (modern İzmit) and jailed in the Armenian church converted into a prison. Finally stabbed to death together with his father near Derbent on 16 August 1915.
|-
| Աբրահամ Հայրիկեան
|
| Killed
|
| Turkologist, director of Ardi college, member of Armenian National Assembly

| Ayaş
| Killed in Angora.
|-
|  Գ. Հիւսեան
|
|
|
| Patriot or educator

|
|
|-
| Հայկ Խօճասարեան
|
| Survived
|
| Teacher, educator, headmaster of Bezciyan school (1901–1924), politician in Ramgavar

| Çankırı
| Permitted to return to Constantinople mid-June 1915, deputy of the Armenian National Assembly in 1919 became later chancellor of the Diocese of the Armenian Church of America.
|-
| Մկրտիչ Յովհաննէսեան
|
| Killed
| Dashnak
| Teacher

| Ayaş
| Killed in Angora.
|-
| Մկրտիչ Յովհաննէսեան
|
| Survived
|
|
| Ayaş
| Deported in lieu of Dashnak member Mkritch Hovhannessian, returned to Constantinople.
|-
|  (Hrant)Մելքոն Կիւրճեան (Հրանդ)
| 1859 in Palu
| Killed
| Dashnak
| Writer, publicist, armenologist, member of Armenian National Assembly

| Ayaş
| Killed in Angora.
|-
| Գրիգոր Հիւրմիւզ
|
| Killed
|
| Writer, publicist

|
|
|-
| Խաչիկ Իտարէճեան
|
| Killed
|
| Teacher

| Ayaş
| Killed in Angora.
|-
| Գառնիկ Ինճիճեան
|
| Survived
|
| Merchant

| Çankırı
| Released upon request.
|-
| (Dkhruni)Արիս Իսրայէլեան (Տխրունի)
| 1885
| Died
| Dashnak
| Teacher, writer

| Çankırı
| Was in Konya in 1916, died later under unknown circumstances.
|-
| Աբիկ Ճամպազ
| from Pera
| Died
| Armenian-Catholic
| Merchant

| Çankırı
| Permitted to return to Constantinople soon after 11 May 1915.
|-
| Յարութիւն Ճանկիւլեան
| 1855  in Van
| Killed
| Hunchak
| One of the organizers of the 1890 Kumkapı affray, political activist, member of Armenian National Assembly, published his memoirs in 1913.

| Ayaş
| Dispatched to Diyarbakir, but executed after Aleppo between Urfa and Severek by Haci Tellal Hakimoglu (Haci Onbasi) – Removed from the Ayaş prison on 5 May and taken under military escort to Diyarbakır along with Daghavarian, Agnouni, Khajag, Minassian and Zartarian to appear before a court martial there and they were, seemingly, murdered by state-sponsored paramilitary groups led by Cherkes Ahmet, and lieutenants Halil and Nazım, at a locality called  shortly before arriving at Diyarbakır. The murderers were tried and executed in Damascus by Cemal Pasha in September 1915, and the assassinations became the subject of a 1916 investigation by the Ottoman Parliament led by Artin Boshgezenian, the deputy for Aleppo.
|-
| Արամ Գալէնտէրեան
|
| Survived
|
| Official of the Ottoman Bank

|
| Granted permission to return.
|-
| Յարութիւն Գալֆաեան
| in Üsküdar
| Died
| Hunchak
| Director of Arhanyan College

| Çankırı
| Died in 1915. Not to be confused with his namesake, also a deportee but a Dashnak member, who was mayor of Bakırköy (Makriköy) quarter of Constantinople.
|-
| Յարութիւն Գալֆաեան
| 1870  in Talas
| Died in Angora
| Dashnak
| Lawyer, mayor of Bakırköy (Makriköy)

| Çankırı
| Died in 1915. Uncle of Nshan Kalfayan. Not to be confused with his namesake, also a deportee but a Hunchak member, who was a schoolmaster.
|-
| Նշան Գալֆաեան
| 16 April 1865  in Üsküdar<ref name="Teo10">Teotig (Teotoros Lapçinciyan): Ամէնուն Տարեցոյցը. 1910. [Everyone's Almanac. 1910], V. and H. Der Nersesian Editions, Constantinople,  1910, p. 318</ref>
| Survived
|
| Agronomist, lecturer in agriculture at Berberyan school

| Çankırı
| Permitted to return to Constantinople soon after 11 May 1915. Moved to Greece in 1924. Invited to Persia in 1927 to administer properties of the Shah. Was a correspondent for the Académie française.
|-
| KantarenԳանթարեն
|
|
|
|
| Çankırı
|
|-
| Ռաֆայէլ Գարակէօզեան
|
| Survived
|
|
| Çankırı
| Permitted to return to Constantinople by a telegramme from Talat Pasha on 7 May 1915.
|-
| (?)  Թագւոր Գարակէօզեան
|
|
|
| Merchant

| Çankırı
|
|-
|  Վարդան Քհնյ. Գարակէօզեան
| 15 July 1877  in Kumkapı, Constantinople
| Survived
|
| Clergyman from Feriköy
| Çankırı
| Departed from Çankırı in winter after seven months and survived the next three years as refugee in Uşak together with his companions Hovhan Vartaped Garabedian, Kaspar Cheraz, Mikayel Shamtanchian. After the armistice he returned to Constantinople.
|-
| Արիստակէս Գասպարեան
| 1861  in Adana
| Killed
|
| Lawyer, businessman, member of Armenian National Assembly

| Ayaş
| Killed in Angora.
|-
|  Յուսիկ Ա. Քհնյ. Քաջունի
| 1851  in Arapgir
| Died
| Dashnak
| Clergyman

| Çankırı
| Deported further and died from illness in a village near Meskene.  He died at the same time in the same tent as Yervant Chavushyan.
|-
| Գէորգ Գայըգճեան
|
| Killed
|
| Merchant

| Çankırı
| Belonged to the second convoy with only one or two survivors that left Çankırı on 19 August 1915, jailed in Angora 20–24 August killed en route to Yozgat. Three Kayekjian brothers were deported and killed altogether near Angora.
|-
| Լեւոն Գայըգճեան
|
| Killed
|
| Merchant

| Çankırı
| Belonged to the second convoy with only one or two survivors that left Çankırı on 19 August 1915, jailed in Angora 20–24 August killed en route to Yozgat. Three Kayekjian brothers were deported and killed altogether near Angora.
|-
| Միհրան Գայըգճեան
|
| Killed
|
| Merchant

| Çankırı
| Belonged to the second convoy with only one or two survivors that left Çankırı on 19 August 1915, jailed in Angora 20–24 August killed en route to Yozgat. Three Kayekjian brothers were deported and killed altogether near Angora.
|-
|   Արշակ Քհնյ. Գազազեան
|
| Survived
|
| Clergyman

| Çankırı
|
|-
| Բիւզանդ Քէչեան
| 1859
| Survived
|
| Editor, owner of influential newspaper Piuzantion, historian
| Çankırı
| Permitted to return to Constantinople by special telegramme from Talat Pasha on 7 May 1915. The eight prisoners of this group were notified on Sunday, 9 May 1915, about their release and left Çankırı on 11 May 1915. Returned to Constantinople on 1 May 1915 [old calendar](?) and stayed in Plovdiv, Bulgaria, until the end of the war, died in 1927 or 1928.
|-
| (Dökmeji Vahan)Վահան Քէհեաեան
|1874  in Urfa
| Killed
| Hunchak
| Patriot or educator and craftsman
| Çankırı
| Killed on 26 August 1915 together with Ruben Sevak, Daniel Varoujan, Onnik Maghazajian, Artin Kocho.
|-
| Տիրան Քէլէկեան
| 1862  Kayseri
| Killed
| Ramgavar
| Writer, university professor, publisher of a popular Turkish language newspapar, Sabah, freemason, author of a French-Turkish dictionary which is still a reference.

| Çankırı
| Permitted to reside with his family anywhere outside Constantinople by special order from Talat Pasha on 8 May 1915, chose Smyrna, but was taken under military escort to Çorum to appear before a court martial and killed on 20 October 1915 on the way to Sivas between Yozgat and Kayseri near the bridge Cokgöz on the Kizilirmak.
|-
| Ագրիկ Քերեսթեճեան
| 1855  in Kartal
| Died
|
| Merchant of wood (coincides with the literal meaning of his name)

|
|
|-
| Պատ. Կարապետ Քերոբեան
| from Balıkesir
| Survived
|
| Pastor

| Çankırı
| Permitted to return to Constantinople by special telegramme from Talat Pasha on 7 May 1915. The eight prisoners of this group were notified on Sunday, 9 May 1915, about their release and left Çankırı on 11 May 1915. He went to America.
|-
| Միրզա Քեթենենճեան
|
| Survived
| Dashnak
|
|
|
|-
|  born as Karekin ChakalianԳարեգին Խաժակ (Գարեգին Չագալեան)
| 1867  in Alexandropol
| Killed
| Dashnak
| Newspaper editor, teacher.

| Ayaş
| Removed from the Ayaş prison on 5 May and taken under military escort to Diyarbakır along with Daghavarian, Agnouni, Jangülian, Minassian and Zartarian to appear before a court martial there and they were, seemingly, murdered by state-sponsored paramilitary groups led by Cherkes Ahmet, and lieutenants Halil and Nazım, at a locality called  shortly before arriving at Diyarbakır. The murderers were tried and executed in Damascus by Cemal Pasha in September 1915, and the assassinations became the subject of a 1916 investigation by the Ottoman Parliament led by Artin Boshgezenian, the deputy for Aleppo.
|-
|  Ա. Խազխազեան
|
|
|
| Merchant

|
|
|-
| KherbekianԽերպէկեան
| from Erzurum
|
|
| Merchant

| Konya
| Granted permission to return.
|-
| Յովհաննէս Գըլըճեան
|
| Killed
|
| Bookseller

| Ayaş
| Killed in Angora.
|-
|  (S. Srents)Սարգիս Գըլճեան (Ս. Սրենց)
|
| Survived
| Dashnak
| Teacher, writer, publicist

| Çankırı
| Escaped from Çankırı to Konya and became Deputy of the Armenian National Assembly in 1919.
|-
| (Kmpetian)Յովհաննէս Գմբէթեան
| 1894 in Sivas
| Killed
|
| Armenian poet and educator

| Çankırı
| Killed during the deportation in Ras al-Ain.
|-
|  (Harutiun Pekmezian)Գոչօ Արթին (Յարութիւն Պէքմէզեան)
|
| Killed
|
| Bread seller in Ortaköy

| Çankırı
| Killed by 12 çetes on 26 August 1915 6 hours after Çankırı near the han of Tüneh in a group of five.
|-
|  Գէորգ կամ Յովհաննէս Քէօլէեան
|
| Killed
|
|
| Çankırı
| Killed near Angora.
|-
| Ներսէս (Տէր-) Գէորգեան
|
|
|
| Merchant

| Çankırı
| Was betrayed by a competitor.
|-
| KomitasԿոմիտաս
| 1869  in Kütahya
| Survived
|
| Priest, composer, ethnomusicologist, founder of a number choirs

| Çankırı
| Permitted to return to Constantinople by special telegramme from Talat Pasha on 7 May 1915. The eight prisoners of this group were notified on Sunday, 9 May 1915, about their release and left Çankırı on 11 May 1915 – developed a severe form of Posttraumatic stress disorder and spent twenty years in virtual silence in mental asylums, died 1935 in Paris.
|-
| Յարութիւն Գօնիալեան
|
| Killed
|
| Tailor

| Ayaş
| Killed in Angora.
|-
| Յակոբ Գորեան
| from Akn, in his seventies
| Survived
|
| Merchant, occasionally a teacher

| Çankırı
| Permitted to return to Constantinople soon after 11 May 1915. He left Çankırı on 6 August 1915, was jailed in Angora, was displaced to Tarson, arrived in Constantinople on 22 September 1915.
|-
| KosmosԿոզմոս
|
|
|
|
| Çankırı
|
|-
| Շաւարշ Քրիսեան
| 1886 in Constantinople
| Killed
| Dashnak
| Writer, publicist, teacher, editor of the first sports magazine of the Ottoman Empire Marmnamarz| Ayaş
| He organized gym exercises in Ayaş. Until the deportees of Ayaş had learned about the 20 Hunchakian gallows of 15 June 1915, they were not realising the severity of their situation. The exercises were viewed by the Turkish guards with great suspicion. Shavarsh Krissian was killed in Angora.
|-
|  Մ. Գունտագճեան
|
|
|
| Lawyer

|
|
|-
|-
|  (Kirishchiyan)Լեւոն Լարենց Քիրիշճեան
| 1882 in Constantinople
| Killed
| Hunchak
| Poet, translator, professor of literature.

| Ayaş
| Killed during the deportation in Angora.
|-
| Օննիկ Մաղազաճեան
| 1878  in Constantinople
| Killed
| Chairman of Kumkapı Progressive Society
| Cartographer, bookseller

| Çankırı
| "Permitted to reside freely in Çankırı" according to a telegramme from the Ministry of the Interior on 25 August 1915 on the subject of exiles erroneously unlisted in a former 3 August telegramme. Killed in a village called Tüney in 1915, together with Ruben Sevak, Daniel Varoujan and Gülistanian in a group of five.
|-
| (Maniassian)Աստուածատուր Մանեսեան
|
| Survived
|
| Merchant

| Çankırı
|
|-
| Պետրոս Մանիկեան
|
| Survived
| Çankırı
| Pharmacist

|
|
|-
| Վրթանէս Մարտիկեան
|
| Survived
|
|
| Ayaş
| Deported in a group of 50 persons to Angora, 5 May 1915, dispatched to Ayaş on 7 May 1915, set free in July 1915, returned to Constantinople.
|-
| Marzbed(Ghazar Ghazarian)Մարզպետ (Ղազար Ղազարեան)
|
| Died
| Dashnak
| Teacher

| Ayaş
| Dispatched around 18 May 1915 to Kayseri to appear before a court martial, worked under fake Turkish identity for the Germans in Intilli (Amanus railway tunnel), escaped to Nusaybin where he fell from a horse and died right before the armistice.
|-
|  Ա. Տ. Մատթէոսեան
|
|
|
| Lawyer, writer

|
|
|-
|  Մելիք Մելիքեան
|
| Killed
|
|
| Çankırı
|
|-
| Սիմոն Մելքոնեան
| from Ortaköy
| Survived
|
| Architect

| Çankırı
| Permitted to return to Constantinople soon after 11 May 1915.
|-
| Թ. Մենծիկեան
|
| Killed
|
| Merchant

| Ayaş
| Killed in Angora.
|-
| born as Aram AshotՍարգիս Մինասեան
| 1873 inÇengiler, Yalova
| Killed
| Dashnak
| Chief editor of Droshak, Editor of Armenian newspaper in Boston till 1909, teacher, writer and political activist in the Ottoman capital after 1909; member of Armenian National Assembly

| Ayaş
| Removed from the Ayaş prison on 5 May and taken under military escort to Diyarbakır along with Daghavarian, Agnouni, Jangülian, Khajag and Zartarian to appear before a court martial there and they were, seemingly, murdered by state-sponsored paramilitary groups led by Cherkes Ahmet, and lieutenants Halil and Nazım, at a locality called  shortly before arriving at Diyarbakır. The murderers were tried and executed in Damascus by Cemal Pasha in September 1915, and the assassinations became the subject of a 1916 investigation by the Ottoman Parliament led by Artin Boshgezenian, the deputy for Aleppo.
|-
| Գրիգոր Միսքճեան
| 1865
| Killed
| brother of Stepan Miskjian
| Pharmacist

| Çankırı
| Belonged to the second convoy with only one or two survivors that left Çankırı on 19 August 1915, jailed in Angora 20–24 August killed en route to Yozgat, killed near Angora.
|-
| Ստեփան Միսքճեան
| 1852  in Constantinople
| Killed
| brother of Krikor Miskjian
| Physician

| Çankırı
| Belonged to the second convoy with only one or two survivors that left Çankırı on 19 August 1915, jailed in Angora 20–24 August killed en route to Yozgat, killed near Angora.
|-
| Զարեհ Մոմճեան
|
| Killed
|
| Translator at the Russian Consulate

| Çankırı
| "Pardoned on condition on not returning to Constantinople" according to a telegramme from the Ministry of the Interior on 25 August 1915 on the subject of exiles erroneously unlisted in a former 3 August telegramme. Belonged to the second convoy with only two survivors that left Çankırı on 19 August 1915, jailed in Angora 20–24 August killed en route to Yozgat.
|-
| Աբիկ Միւպահեաճեան
|
| Survived
|
| Publicist

| Konya
| Granted permission to return.
|-
|  Աւետիս Նագաշեան
|
| Survived
|
| Physician

| Ayaş
| Was set free 23 July 1915, sent his family to Bulgaria, served in the Ottoman army as captain in the Gülhane Hospital at the time of the Gallipoli campaign and immigrated to the US.
|-
| NakulianՆագուլեան
|
| Survived
|
| Doctor
| Ayaş
| Exiled 3 May 1915. Allowed to move free in Ayaş. Returned later to Constantinople.
|-
| Յակոբ Նարկիլէճեան
|
| Survived
|
| Pharmacist in the army

| Çankırı
| Permitted to return to Constantinople by special telegramme from Talat Pasha on 7 May 1915. The eight prisoners of this group were notified on Sunday, 9 May 1915, about their release and left Çankırı on 11 May 1915.
|-
| Մարկոս Նաթանեան
|
| Survived
|
| Member of Armenian National Assembly

| Çorum
| Survived deportation to Çorum and later to Iskiliben, was permitted to go back.
|-
| Հրանդ Նազարեան
|
|
|
|
| Çankırı
|
|-
| Սերովբէ Նորատունկեան
|
| Killed
| Dashnak
| Teacher at the Sanassarian college and member of Armenian National Assembly

| Ayaş
| Killed in Angora.
|-
| NosrigianՆօսրիկեան
| from Erzurum
| Survived
|
| Merchant

| Konya
| Granted permission to return.
|-
| NshanՆշան
|
| Killed
|
| Tattooist in Kumkapı

| Ayaş
| Killed in Angora.
|-
| Նշան Օտեան
|
|
| Hunchak
|
| Ayaş
|
|-
| Երուանդ Օտեան
| 1869  in Constantinople
| Survived
|
| Writer
| Ayaş
| Deported August 1915. Accompanied Karekin Vrtd. Khatchaturian (prelate of Konia) from Tarson to Osmanieh. Islamized in 1916 under the name Aziz Nuri in Hama. After failed attempts to escape from Der Zor, Odian worked in a factory for military uniforms together with Armenian deportees from Aintab. Soon afterwards he became translator to the military commander of Der Zor. Finally he was orderly to the commander Edwal of the German garrison in Der Zor and gave account of the killing of the last deportees from Constantinople in the prison of Der Zor as late as January 1918 and described that all the policemen and officials kept Armenian women.
|-
| Արամ Օննիկեան
|
| Survived
|
| Merchant, chemist

| Çankırı
| Son of Krikor Onnikian
|-
| Յովհաննէս Օննիկեան
|
| Died
|
| Merchant

| Çankırı
| Son of Krikor Onnikian; died from illness in Hajkiri near Çankırı.
|-
| Գրիգոր Օննիկեան
| 1840
| Died
|
| Merchant

| Çankırı
| Father of Aram, Hovhannes and Mkrtich Onnikian; died from illness in Çankırı.
|-
|  Մկրտիչ Օննիկեան
|
| Died
|
| Merchant

| Çankırı
| Son of Krikor Onnikian; died in Der Zor.
|-
| PanaghoghՓանաղող
|
|
|
| Writer, publicist

|
|
|-
|  Շաւարշ Փանոսեան
|
| Survived
|
| Teacher from Pera.

| Ayaş
| Granted permission to return.
|-
| (Vartabed Mashtots)Ներսէս Փափազեան
|
| Killed
| Dashnak
| Editor of Azadamard, Patriot or educator

| Ayaş
| Killed in Angora.
|-
| Վրթանէս Փափազեան
|
| Survived
|
| Tailor

| Çankırı
| Wrongly deported as he bore the same name as the novelist who escaped to Bulgaria and later to Russia. Permitted to return to Constantinople soon after 11 May 1915.
|-
| Արտաշես Փարիսեան
|
| Survived
|
| Merchant

| Çankırı
|
|-
| Parseghian Բարսեղեան
|
| Survived
|
|
| Ayaş
| Granted permission to return.
|-
|  Արմենակ Բարսեղեան
|
| Survived
| Dashnak
| Teacher, studied philosophy in Berlin, lived in Pera

| Çankırı
| Permitted to return to Constantinople soon after 11 May 1915.
|-
|   Յ. Բարսեղեան
|
|
|
| Patriot or educator

|
|
|-
| Գեղամ Բարսեղեան
| 1883 in Constantinople
| Killed
| Dashnak
| Writer, publicist, editor, teacher

| Ayaş
| Killed in Angora.
|-
| (Shamil)Սարգիս Բարսեղեան (Շամիլ)
|
| Killed
|
| Patriot or educator

| Ayaş
|
|-
| Կարապետ Փաշայեան Խան
| 1864  in Constantinople
| Killed
| Dashnak
| Physician, writer former deputy of the Ottoman parliament, member of Armenian National Assembly

| Ayaş
| First tortured  and then killed in Angora.
|-
|  Մ. Փիոսեան
|
|
|
| Patriot or educator

|
|
|-
| Der-GhazaryantsՍմբատ  ԲիւրատՏէր-Ղազարեանց
| 1862  in Zeytun (Süleymanlı today)
| Died
|
| Novelist, public figure, member of Armenian National Assembly

| Ayaş
| Killed in Angora.
|-
|-
|  Կ. Րէյիսեան
|
|
|
| Merchant

|
|
|-
|   Րոստոմ (Րիւսթէմ Րոստոմեանց)
|
| Killed
|
| Merchant and public figure

| Ayaş
| Killed in Angora.
|-
|-
| Վրամշապուհ Սամուէլօֆ
|
| Killed
|
| Merchant Armenian from Russia, banker
| Ayaş
| Killed in Angora.
|-
| SarafianՍարաֆեան
|
|
|
|
| Çankırı
|
|-
| Կարապետ Սարաֆեան
|
| Killed
|
| Public official

| Ayaş
| Killed in Angora.
|-
| SatoՍաթօ
|
|
|
| Patriot or educator

|
|
|-
|  (Pailag)Ժագ Սայապալեան (Փայլակ)
| 1880  in Konya
| Killed
| Armenian National Assembly
| Interpreter for the British Consul in Konya between 1901 and 1905, then vice-consul for a year and a half. After 1909, journalist in the capital.

| Çankırı
| Killed in Angora.
|-
| Մարկոս Սեֆեր
|
| Survived
|
| Lawyer

| Ayaş
| Deported in place of Markos Natanian and returned to Constantinople.
|-
| Վարդգէս Սէրէնկիւլեան
| 1871 in Erzurum
| Killed
|
| Deputy in the Ottoman parliament
| Dispatched to Diyarbakır to appear before a court martial
| Deported 21 May 1915 or 2 June 1915. Same fate as Krikor Zohrab. (Cherkes Ahmet and Halil were led to Damascus and executed there on orders from Cemal Pasha, in connection with the murder of the two deputies, on 30 September 1915, Nazım had died in a fight before that.)
|-
| Պաղտասար Սարգիսեան
|
| Survived
|
|
| Çankırı
| "Pardoned on condition on not returning to Constantinople" according to a telegramme from the Ministry of the Interior on 25 August 1915 on the subject of exiles erroneously unlisted in a former 3 August telegramme.
|-
|  Effendi (Prudian)Մարկոս Սէրվէթ
|
| Survived
|
| Lawyer from Kartal

| Ayaş
| Granted permission to return.
|-
| Ռուբէն Սեւակ
| 1885  in Silivri
| Killed
|
| Physician, prominent poet and writer, formerly captain in the Ottoman Army during the Balkan Wars
| Çankırı
| Deported 22 June 1915 but was "Permitted to reside freely in Çankırı" according to a telegramme from the Ministry of the Interior on 25 August 1915 on the subject of exiles erroneously unlisted in a former 3 August telegramme. Killed in a village called Tüney in 1915, together with Gülistanyan, Daniel Varoujan and Mağazacıyan in a group of five. His house in Elmadağı, Constantinople is now a museum.
|-
| ShahbazՇահպազ
|
|
|
| Patriot or educator

|
|
|-
| Բարսեղ Շահպազ
| 1883  in Boyacıköy, Constantinople
| Killed
| Dashnak
| Lawyer, journalist, columnist

| Çankırı
| "Murdered on Harput-Malatya road." On 6 July 1915, in a letter to Miss. Zaruhi Bahri and Evgine Khachigian, Parsegh Shahbaz wrote from Aintab that due to his wounded feet and stomachaches, he will rest for 6–7 days until he has to continue the 8–10 days journey to M. Aziz. But he had no idea why he was sent there. According to Vahe-Haig (Վահէ-Հայկ), survivor of the massacre of Harput, Parsegh Shahbaz was jailed 8 days after the massacre in the central prison of Mezre. Parsegh Shahbaz remained without food for a week and was severely beaten and finally killed by gendarmes under the wall of 'the factory'.
|-
|  Ա. Շահէն
|
|
|
| Patriot or educator

|
|
|-
| Ենովք Շահէն
| 1881 in Bardizag (near İzmit)
| Killed
|
| Actor

| Ayaş
| Killed in Angora.
|-
| Սարգիս Շահինեան
|
| Survived
|
|
| Çankırı
| "Pardoned on condition on not returning to Constantinople" according to a telegramme from the Ministry of the Interior on 25 August 1915 on the subject of exiles erroneously unlisted in a former 3 August telegramme.
|-
| Harutiun Shahrigian (Adom)Յարութիւն Շահրիկեան (Ատոմ)
| 1860 in Shabin-Karahisar
| Killed
| Dashnak
| Dashnak leader, lawyer, member of Armenian National Assembly.

| Ayaş
| First tortured and then killed in Angora.
|-
| Լեւոն Շամտանճեան
|
| Survived
|
|
| Ayaş
| Deported in lieu of Mikayel Shamtanchian, returned to Constantinople.
|-
| Միքայէլ Շամտանճեան
| 1874
| Survived
| Friend of Dikran Chökürian
| Newspaper editor at Vostan, writer, lecturer, leader in the Armenian National Assembly
| Çankırı
| Departed from Çankırı in winter after seven months and survived the next three years as refugee in Uşak together with his companions Hovhan Vartaped Garabedian, Kaspar Cheraz, Vartan Kahanay Karagözian from Feriköy. After the armistice he returned to Constantinople. Published his memoirs of exile after the war. – d. 1926
|-
| Լեւոն Շաշեան
|
| Killed
|
| Merchant

|
| Killed in Der Zor.
|-
| Siamanto (Adom Yerdjanian)Սիամանթօ (Ատոմ Եարճանեան)
| 1878  in Akn
| Killed
| Dashnak
| Poet, writer, member of Armenian National Assembly

|
| Killed in Angora.
|-
| Գրիգոր Սիւրմէեան
|
| Survived
|
| Father of Artavazd V. Siurmeian.

| Ayaş
| Granted permission to return to Constantinople.
|-
|  (Onnig Jirayr)Օննիկ Սրապեան (Օննիկ Ժիրայր)
| 1878 in Erzincan
| Killed
|
| Teacher

| Ayaş
| Killed in Angora.
|-
| Եղիա Սուղիկեան
|
|
|
| Writer, publicist
|
| Met Yervant Odian and Aram Andonian in September 1915 while working in the mill of Aram and Ardashes Shalvarjian in Tarson (supplying daily 30,000 Ottoman soldiers with flour).
|-
|  Ս. Սուին
|
|
|
| Patriot or educator
| 24 April 1915
|
|-
| Միհրան Թապագեան
| 1878    from Adapazar
| Killed
| Dashnak
| Teacher and writer

| Çankırı
| Belonged to the second convoy with only one or two survivors that left Çankırı on 19 August 1915, jailed in Angora 20–24 August killed en route to Yozgat.
|-
|  Կարապետ Թաշճեան
|
| Killed
|
|
| Ayaş
| Killed in Angora.
|-
| Կարապետ Թաշճեան
|
| Survived
|
| Butcher

| Çankırı
| Deported in lieu of Garabed Tashjian jailed in Ayaş, released and returned to Constantinople.
|-
| Ստեփան Թաթարեան
|
| Survived
|
| Merchant

| Çankırı
| Dispatched to Kayseri to appear before a court martial (where he was an eyewitness to executions). Joined by a group of four from Ayaş beginning of July. Survived deportation from Çankırı to Kayseri to Aleppo and returned to Constantinople after the armistice.
|-
| Գէորգ Թէրճիմանեան
|
| Killed
| Ayaş
| Merchant

|
| Killed in Angora.
|-
| Օհաննես Թէրլէմէզեան
| from Van
| Survived
|
| Money changer

| Çankırı
| Permitted to return to Constantinople soon after 11 May 1915. One of the last who was released from Çankırı. He left Çankırı on 6 August 1915, was jailed in Angora, came to Tarson, arrived in Constantinople on 22 September 1915.
|-
| Յակոբ Թէրզեան
| 1879 in Hadjin
| Killed
| Hunchak
| Pharmacist

| Çankırı
| Belonged to the second convoy with only one or two survivors that left Çankırı on 19 August 1915, jailed in Angora 20–24 August killed en route to Yozgat, killed near Angora.
|-
| Հայկ Թիրեաքեան
| about60 years old
| Survived
|
| Cashier of Phoenix| Ayaş
| Deported instead of his Dashnak homonym. Returned to Constantinople.
|-
| Հայկ Թիրեաքեան (Հրաչ)
| 1871  in Trabzon
| Killed
| Dashnak
| Member of Armenian National Assembly
| Çankırı
| After learning that another Haig Tiriakian had been detained in Ayaş he demanded his namesake's release and his own transfer from Çankırı to Ayaş. He was later killed in Angora.
|-
| Երուանդ Թօլայեան
| 1883
| Survived
|
| Theater director, playwright, editor of the satirical journal Gavroche| Çankırı
| Permitted to return to Constantinople by special telegramme from Talat Pasha on 7 May 1915. The eight prisoners of this group were notified on Sunday, 9 May 1915, about their release and left Çankırı on 11 May 1915. Yervant Tolayan died in 1937.
|-
|   Յակոբ Թօփճեան
| 1876
| Survived
| Ramgavar
| Editor

| Çankırı
| Permitted to return to Constantinople mid-June 1915, died in 1951.
|-
| TorkomԹորգոմ
|
|
|
| Patriot or educator

|
|
|-
| Վահրամ Թորգոմեան
| 20 April 1858    in Constantinople
| Survived
|
| Physician, medical historian

| Çankırı
| Permitted to return to Constantinople by special telegramme from Talat Pasha on 7 May 1915. The eight prisoners of this group were notified on Sunday, 9 May 1915, about their release and left Çankırı on 11 May 1915. He moved to France in 1922. He published a book after the war (a list of Armenian doctors) in Évreux, France in 1922 and a study on Ethiopean Taenicide-Kosso in Antwerp in 1929. He died 11 August 1942 in Paris.
|-
|  (Tomajanian)Սամուել Թումաճան (Թոմաճանեան)
|
| Died
| Hunchak
|
| Çankırı
| Permitted to return to Constantinople soon after 11 May 1915. Samvel Tomajian/Թօմաճեան (!) died according to Alboyajian.
|-
|-
| Դանիէլ Վարուժան
| 1884  in Brgnik (near Sivas)
| Killed
|
| Poet

| Çankırı
| Killed together with Ruben Sevak by 12 çetes on 26 August 1915 six hours after Çankırı near the han of Tüneh in a group of five.
|-
|-
|  Արամ Երջանիկ
| 1865
| Died
|
| Restaurant owner
| Çankırı
| Deported because many intellectuals regularly met at his restaurant in Bahçekapı, died in 1915.
|-
|  Տ. Երկանեան
|
|
|
| Lawyer
|
|
|-
| Գրիգոր Եսայեան
| 1883  from Van
| Killed
| Dashnak
| French and Math teacher, translator of Levon Shant's Ancient Gods into French

| Çankırı
| Belonged to the second convoy with only one or two survivors that left Çankırı on 19 August 1915, jailed in Angora 20–24 August killed en route to Yozgat.
|-
| YeznikԵզնիկ
|
|
|
| Profession
| Çankırı
|
|-
|-
| Ներսէս Զաքարեան
|
| Killed
| Hunchak
| Patriot or educator, member of Armenian National Assembly

| Ayaş
| Killed in Angora.
|-
| Աւետիս Զարիֆեան
|
| Survived
|
| Pharmacist
| Çankırı
| Permitted to return to Constantinople soon after 11 May 1915.
|-
| Ռուբէն Զարդարեան
| 1874  in Kharpert
| Killed
|
| Writer, poet, newspaper (Azadamard) and textbook editor, considered a pioneer of Armenian rural literature. Translated Victor Hugo, Maxim Gorki, Anatole France, Oscar Wilde into Armenian.

| Ayaş
| Removed from the Ayaş prison on 5 May and taken under military escort to Diyarbakır along with Daghavarian, Agnouni, Jangülian, Khajag and Minassian to appear before a court martial there and they were, seemingly, murdered by state-sponsored paramilitary groups led by Cherkes Ahmet, and lieutenants Halil and Nazım, at a locality called  shortly before arriving at Diyarbakır. The murderers were tried and executed in Damascus by Cemal Pasha in September 1915, and the assassinations became the subject of a 1916 investigation by the Ottoman Parliament led by Artin Boshgezenian, the deputy for Aleppo.
|-
| ZenopԶենոբ
|
|
|
|
| Çankırı
|
|-
| Գրիգոր Զօհրապ
| 1861 in Constantinople
| Killed
|
| Writer, jurist, deputy in the Ottoman parliament
| Dispatched to Diyarbakır to appear before a court martial
| Deported either 21 May 1915 or 2 June 1915. Ordered to appear before a court martial in Diyarbakır, together with Vartkes Hovhannes Serengülyan, both went to Aleppo by train, escorted by one gendarme, remained in Aleppo for a few weeks, waited the results of infructuous attempts by the Ottoman governor of the city to have them sent back to Constantinople (some sources mention Cemal Pasha himself intervening for their return, but Talat Pasha insisting on them to sent to the court martial), and then dispatched to Urfa and remained there for some time in the house of a Turkish deputy friend, taken under police escort and led to Diyarbakır by car -allegedly accompanied on a voluntary basis by some notable Urfa Armenians, and with many sources confirming, they were murdered by state-sponsored paramilitary groups led by Cherkes Ahmet, Halil and Nazım, at a locality called Karaköprü or Şeytanderesi in the outskirts of Urfa, some time between 15 July and 20 July 1915. The murderers were tried and executed in Damascus by Cemal Pasha in September 1915, and the assassinations became the subject of a 1916 investigation by the Ottoman Parliament led by Artin Boshgezenian, the deputy for Aleppo.
|-
| (Jirayr)Բարթող Զօրեան (Ժիրայր)
| 1879 in Tamzara
| Killed
| Dashnak
| Publicist
| Ayaş
| Killed in Angora.
|-
|}

Notes

References

Reference notes

Bibliography

 
 Krikor Balakian Հայ Գողգոթան [The Armenian Golgotha], Mechitaristenpresse Vienna 1922 (vol. 1) and Paris 1956 (vol. 2) (a new edition in French: Georges Balakian: Le Golgotha arménien'', Le cercle d'écrits caucasiens, La Ferté-Sous-Jouarre 2002 (vol. 1) ,  2004 (vol. 2) )
  [essay about the survivor literature 1918–23]
 
 
  [Gives an account of over 1.500 deported clergymen all over the Ottoman Empire with selected biographical entries and lists 100 notables of 24 April 1915 by name out of 270 in total and classifies them roughly in 9 professional groups]

Further reading

External links
 Armenian Genocide Archives
 

Armenian genocide
Deportation
Lists of Armenian people
Lists of 20th-century people
People who died in the Armenian genocide

Political and cultural purges
1915 in the Ottoman Empire
Deportation
Ottoman Empire-related lists
Persecution of Christians in the Ottoman Empire
Persecution in the Ottoman Empire
Persecution of intellectuals
Anti-intellectualism
1910s-related lists
April 1915 events